The highest temperature ever recorded in Australia is , which was recorded on 2 January 1960 at Oodnadatta, South Australia and 13 January 2022 at Onslow, Western Australia.

Highest temperatures recorded in Australia

This record has been removed by the Bureau of Meteorology though as it was measured using a non-standard temperature screen.

Highest temperatures for each state and territory

Lowest temperatures recorded in Australia

Lowest temperatures for each state and territory

Miscellaneous records

See also
Climate of Australia

Notes

References

Climate of Australia
Weather extremes of Earth
Australia